The Sherman Library & Gardens are botanical gardens in Corona del Mar, California. The gardens are open to the public every day, closed Thanksigiving Day, Christmas Day and New Year's Day . An admission fee is charged. Today's garden began in 1955 when Arnold D. Haskell bought the Norman's Nursery property. Haskell named the Library and Gardens after his mentor and benefactor, M. H. Sherman.

The gardens include patios and conservatories, seasonal flower beds, and fountains. Collections range from desert plants to tropical vegetation. The Succulent Garden includes a California pepper tree. A tropical conservatory at the site features orchids, heliconias, and gingers. The Fern Grotto exhibits mature staghorn ferns, and the Herb Garden shows a variety of herbs, including chocolate and orange-mint, tri-color and society garlic.

See also 

 List of botanical gardens in the United States

References

External links 
 Sherman Library and Gardens

Botanical gardens in California
Newport Beach, California
Parks in Orange County, California
Buildings and structures in Newport Beach, California
Japanese gardens in California